Public telephone may refer to:

 Call box
 Courtesy telephone
 Emergency telephone
 Payphone
 Police box
 Red telephone box
 Telephone booth
 Public Telephone (film), a 1980 French documentary film